Ren Quan (born 4 March 1975) is a Chinese actor, investor and businessman. One of his most prominent roles was as Gongsun Ce in Young Justice Bao and its sequel Young Justice Bao II, alongside Zhou Jie, Li Bingbing and Lu Yi. Other notable credits include All the Misfortunes Caused by the Angel and The Nation Under The Foot.

Early life and education 
Ren was born Ren Zhenquan in Qiqihar, Heilongjiang, on 4 March 1975. He attended the No. 6 School of Tiefeng District. In the Qiqihar No. 4 Railway Middle School, he became a literary soldier. He secondary studied at Heilongjiang Art Vocational School.

Acting Career 
Ren made his television debut in Wait All the Way (1994), at the age of 19. 

He became widely known to audiences with Young Justice Bao (2000), in which he portrayed Gongsun Ce, the assistant to Zhou Jie's character. That same year, he starred in All the Misfortunes Caused by the Angel, playing the romantic interest of Lin Xiaoru, Li Xiaolu's character. He also co-starred with Li Bingbing and Li Zonghan in the historical television series The Nation Under The Foot.

In 2001, he reprised his role in the Young Justice Bao sequel, Young Justice Bao II. He had key supporting role in the romantic comedy television series The Book of Love, opposite Fan Bingbing and Le Jiatong. He also appeared in Meeting Aquarium, a romantic comedy television series starring Lu Yi and Mei Ting.

Ren co-starred with Nicky Wu in the 2002 wuxia television series Musketeers and Princess, adapted from Woon Swee Oan's novel of the same title.

In 2007, he made a guest appearance on Feng Xiaogang's war film Assembly. He co-starred with Li Bingbing in the music video Kang Mei's Love, which was one of the most watched music TV in mainland China in that year. He had a small role in  The Double Life, a comedy film starring Zhang Jingchu, Daniel Chan, and Wang Luoyong.

In 2009, Ren portrayed the role of Yan Hui in Hu Mei's biographical drama film Confucius, for which he received Best Supporting Actor nomination at the 19th Golden Rooster Awards.

Ren was cast in time travel television series The Myth (2010), playing the elder brother of Hu Ge's characters. He had a lead role in the war television series, New Drawing Sword.

In 2011, he had a cameo appearance in Palace, a historical romantic television series starring Yang Mi, Feng Shaofeng and Mickey He. He co-starred with Zuo Xiaoqing in Love of The Millennium, based on Chinese folk legend Legend of the White Snake.

In 2012, he co-produced and had a small role in Swordsman, a wuxia television series adaptation based on Jin Yong's the novel The Smiling, Proud Wanderer.

Ren had key supporting role in the television series adaptation of Su Tong's Wives and Concubines (2014).

In 2016, he appeared in Singing All Along, a historical romantic television series starring Ruby Lin, Yu Bo and Yuan Hong.

On 17 March 2016, he announced his retirement from acting on his Sinaweibo and devoted all his energy to business.

Investment career 
After gradation in 1997, Ren founded the "Shu Spicy Fish" restaurant on the street outside the campus of Shanghai Theatre Academy. In 2005, he co-founded the 1969 Bar, which was reshuffled as "Shu Ecological Hotpot" in the following year and invested more than 2 million yuan in Huayi Brothers. He founded the "Legend of Shu in Guangdong" in 2009, Shanghai Qiangsheng Film and Television Culture Media Co., Ltd. in 2010, and "Hot and Spicy No.1" in 2013. In 2014, Ren co-founded Star VC, a venture capital company, with Huang Xiaoming and Li Bingbing. In 2015, he was invited to participate in the Boao Forum for Asia.

Filmography

Film

Television

References

External links 

 
Biography of Ren Quan on the official website of Boao Forum for Asia

1975 births
Living people
People from Qiqihar
Shanghai Theatre Academy alumni
Cheung Kong Graduate School of Business alumni
Chinese male television actors
Chinese male film actors
Chinese investors